The men's 4 × 200 metre freestyle relay was a swimming event held as part of the swimming at the 1920 Summer Olympics programme. It was the third appearance of the event.

A total of 29 swimmers, representing seven teams from seven nations, competed in the event, which was held from Wednesday, August 25 to Sunday, August 29, 1920. Keith Kirkland was replaced by Frank Beaurepaire on the Australian squad between the semifinals and finals. The International Olympic Committee medal database does not show Keith Kirkland as silver medalist for Australia.

Records

These were the standing world and Olympic records (in minutes) prior to the 1920 Summer Olympics.

Note: The team competed as Australasia at the 1912 Games.

In the final the United States set a new world record with 10:04.4 minutes.

Results

Semifinals

Wednesday, August 25, 1920: The top two from each heat and the fastest of third place teams advanced.

Semifinal 1

Semifinal 2

Final

Sunday, August 29, 1920: The split times for the winning team McGillivray 2:27.2, Kealoha 2:33.2, Ross 2:30.0, and Kahanamoku 2:34.0 minutes.

References

 
 

Swimming at the 1920 Summer Olympics
4 × 200 metre freestyle relay
Men's events at the 1920 Summer Olympics